Pingquan is a county-level city of northeastern Hebei province, China, bordering Liaoning province to the east. It is a centre of trade and business, and gold and silver are mined nearby.

History 

Pingguan was formerly called Bakou (Pakow). It absorbed Chinese colonies in the neighboring Mongol land: a large portion of the  Kharachin Right Wing Banner and a large part of the Kharachin Middle Banner. Both banners belonged to the Josutu League. During the Jindandao Incident of 1891, Pingquan was assaulted by Chinese religious sects. Catholic church were burnt and Chinese converts were massacred.

Administrative divisions
There are 10 towns, 4 townships, and 5 ethnic townships under the county's administration.

Climate

Education
Institutions of higher education include:
 Pingquan Hospital of Traditional Chinese Medicine of Chengde
 Pingquan Normal College

Economy
Major local companies include:
 Pingquan Edible Fungus Company
 Pingquan Seeds Co., Ltd
 Pingquan Lihua Cement Co., Ltd
 Hebei Pingquan Changcheng Chemical Co., Ltd (the largest hydrogen fluoride manufacturer in North China)
 Pingquan Yadong The Plastics Co., Ltd
 Pingquan Grain & Oil Group Co., Ltd
 Chengde Jibei Yanshan Activated Carbon Co., Ltd

References

External links

County-level cities in Hebei
Chengde